Düsseldorf-Oberbilk (Oberbilk Bf./PhilipsHalle for the subway station) is an interchange railway station situated at Oberbilk, Düsseldorf in western Germany. It is served by the S1, S6 and S68 lines of Rhine-Ruhr S-Bahn, lines U74, U77 and U79 of Düsseldorf Stadtbahn (light rail), and Tram line 705.

References

Footnotes

Sources

Düsseldorf VRR stations
Railway stations in Düsseldorf
S1 (Rhine-Ruhr S-Bahn)
S6 (Rhine-Ruhr S-Bahn)
S68 (Rhine-Ruhr S-Bahn)
Rhine-Ruhr S-Bahn stations
Railway stations in Germany opened in 1968